Dinarolacerta montenegrina, or Prokletije rock lizard, is a species of lizard in the family Lacertidae. It is found in Montenegro and Albania. It was first described in 2007. It differs genetically and morphologically from the most closely related species, Dinarolacerta mosorensis: in the exterior morphology, it is smaller; it has only one postnasal scale on one or both sides of its head; it has fewer temporal and postocular scales. The skeleton differs from D. mosorensis by its reduced supraocular osteoderms and the absence of an anteromedial process on the postocular bone.

References

Lacertidae
Reptiles described in 2007
Fauna of Albania
Endemic fauna of Montenegro
Taxa named by Katarina Ljubisavljević
Taxa named by Oscar J. Arribas
Taxa named by Georg Džukic
Taxa named by Salvador Carranza